Anja Koser (born 1970) was one of the few, if not the only, women to have competed in the 1990s in two different dominant sports on first league level in Germany. Until 1992 she played team handball with the 1st league team of Bayer 04 Leverkusen. As from season 1993–94 she played football as a member of the team of Grün-Weiß Brauweiler, winning the Women's DFB Pokal 1993–94 consecutively.

References

External links

1970 births
Living people
German women's footballers
German female handball players
German footballers needing infoboxes
Women's association football midfielders